Korçë is a city in southeastern Albania.

Korçë may also refer to:

 Korçë County, an administrative county surrounding Korçë
 Korçë District, a former administrative district surrounding Korçë
 Korce, village in Poland

See also 
 Chrono Cross, a video game character